Saikou Janneh (born 11 January 2000) is a Gambian professional footballer who plays as a forward for AFC Wimbledon, on loan from Cambridge United.

Career
Born in Gunjur, The Gambia, Janneh first moved to England at the age of 13. In 2016, at the age of 16, Janneh joined the Bath City academy in conjunction with studying at Bath College. While studying at Bath College, Janneh played for Western League Premier Division sides Cadbury Heath and Clevedon Town. Janneh also made one appearance for Bath City in the Somerset Premier Cup scoring in a 7–0 win against Wellington.

Having previously had two trials, on 18 May 2018, Janneh joined Championship side Bristol City's academy.

On 28 August 2020, Janneh joined League Two side Newport County on loan until the end of the 2020–21 season. He made his debut for Newport on 8 September 2020, in the starting line up for the 1–0 EFL Trophy defeat to Cheltenham Town. He made his English Football League debut on 12 September 2020, as a second-half substitute for Ryan Taylor in the 1–1 draw for Newport County against Scunthorpe United on the first day of the 2020–21 League Two season. Janneh scored his first goal for Newport in the 1–0 League Two win against Tranmere Rovers on 17 October 2020. On 2 January 2021 his loan spell at Newport was ended.

On 1 January 2022 he joined Shrewsbury Town on loan for the remainder of the season.

On 30 June 2022, Janneh joined League One side Cambridge United on a two-year deal. On 24 January 2023, Janneh joined AFC Wimbledon on loan for the remainder of the season.

Career statistics

References

External links

2000 births
Living people
Gambian footballers
People educated at Bath College
Association football forwards
Western Football League players
English Football League players
National League (English football) players
Cadbury Heath F.C. players
Bath City F.C. players
Clevedon Town F.C. players
Bristol City F.C. players
Torquay United F.C. players
Newport County A.F.C. players
Shrewsbury Town F.C. players
Gambian expatriate footballers
Gambian expatriate sportspeople in England
Expatriate footballers in England
AFC Wimbledon players